Bielsa is a surname. Notable people include:

 Antonio Bielsa Alegre – Spanish archaeologist
 Marcelo Bielsa – Argentine football coach
 María Eugenia Bielsa – Argentine politician (Minister of Territorial Development and Habitat since 2019)
 Rafael Bielsa – Argentine politician (Minister of Foreign Affairs 2005–2007)
 Rosa Bielsa, Spanish tennis player

Spanish-language surnames